Nesah Kuh Veysi Chin (also Romanized as Nesah Kūh Veysī Chīn; also known as Nesā Kūh) is a village in Chin Rural District, Ludab District, Boyer-Ahmad County, Kohgiluyeh and Boyer-Ahmad Province, Iran. At the 2006 census, its population was 194, in 28 families.

References 

Populated places in Boyer-Ahmad County